The Gulf of Asinara is a sea sector included between the Asinara Island, Cape Falcone and the town of Castelsardo, in northern Sardinia, Italy. The communes facing its coast include also Stintino, Porto Torres, Sassari, Sorso, Valledoria and Badesi.

The littoral features several beaches, some kilometers long, such as La Pelosa, le Saline Ezzi Mannu and Fiume Santo, those near Porto Torres, Platamona, the beaches of Castelsardo, Valledoria, Badesi, Trinità d'Agultu, Vignola and Isola Rossa.

Landforms of Sardinia
Asinara